John Tyler Morgan (June 20, 1824 – June 11, 1907) was an American politician was served as a brigadier general in the Confederate States Army during the American Civil War and later was elected for six terms as the U.S. Senator (1877–1907) from the state of Alabama. A prominent slave holder before the Civil War, he purportedly became the second Grand Dragon of the Ku Klux Klan in Alabama during the Reconstruction era. Morgan and fellow Klan member Edmund W. Pettus became the ringleaders of white supremacy in Alabama and did more than anyone else in the state to overthrow Reconstruction efforts in the wake of the Civil War.  When President Ulysses S. Grant dispatched U.S. Attorney General Amos Akerman to prosecute the Klan under the Enforcement Acts, Morgan was arrested and jailed.

Due to his widespread notoriety in Alabama for opposing Reconstruction efforts, Morgan was elected in a landslide as a U.S. Senator in 1876. During his subsequent six terms as Senator, he was an outspoken proponent of states rights, black disfranchisement, racial segregation, and lynching African-Americans. According to historians, he played a leading role "in forging the ideology of white supremacy that dominated American race relations from the 1890s to the 1960s." Widely considered to be among the most prominent racist ideologues of his time, he is often credited by scholars with laying the foundation of the Jim Crow era.

In addition to his lifelong efforts to uphold white supremacy, Morgan became an ardent expansionist and imperialist during the Gilded Age. He envisioned the United States as a globe-spanning empire and believed that island nations such as Hawaii and the Philippines should be forcibly annexed in order for the country to dominate trade in the Pacific Ocean. Accordingly, he advocated for the United States to annex the independent Republic of Hawaii and to construct an inter-oceanic canal in Central America. Due to this advocacy, he was often posthumously referred to as "the Father of the Panama Canal".

After his death in 1907, Morgan's relatives and descendants remained prominent in Alabama politics and high society for many decades. His extended family owned the First White House of the Confederacy in Montgomery. His nephew, Anthony Dickinson Sayre, served as a Justice of the Supreme Court of Alabama, and Morgan's grand-niece was Jazz Age socialite Zelda Sayre, the wife of novelist F. Scott Fitzgerald who wrote The Great Gatsby.

Early life and career 
John Tyler Morgan was born in a log cabin one mile from Athens, Tennessee. His family claimed descent from a Welsh ancestor, James B. Morgan (1607–1704), who settled in the Connecticut Colony. Morgan was initially educated by his mother but, in the fall of 1830, the six-year-old barefoot boy walked a quarter of a mile to attend Old Forest Hill Academy. In 1833, he moved with his parents to Calhoun County, Alabama, where he attended schools and then studied law in Tuskegee with justice William Parish Chilton, his brother-in-law. After admission to the bar he established a practice in Talladega. Ten years later, Morgan moved to Dallas County and resumed the practice of law in Selma and Cahaba.

Turning to politics, Morgan became a presidential elector on the Democratic ticket in 1860, and supported Southern Democrat John C. Breckinridge. One year later, he was a delegate from Dallas County to the Alabama constitutional convention of 1861, and he played a key role in passing the ordinance of secession.

American Civil War 

With Alabama's vote to leave the Union, the 37-year-old Morgan enlisted as a private in the Cahaba Rifles, which volunteered its services in the Confederate Army and was assigned to the 5th Alabama Infantry. He first saw action in a skirmish preceding the First Battle of Manassas in the summer of 1861.

As the war progressed, Morgan rose to major and then lieutenant colonel, serving under Col. Robert E. Rodes, a future Confederate general. Morgan resigned in 1862 and returned to Alabama, where in August he recruited a new regiment, the 51st Alabama Partisan Rangers, becoming its colonel. He led it at the Battle of Murfreesborough, operating in cooperation with the cavalry of Nathan Bedford Forrest. 

When Rodes was promoted to major general and given a division in the Army of Northern Virginia, Morgan declined an offer to command Rodes's old brigade and instead remained in the Western Theater, leading troops at the Battle of Chickamauga. On November 16, 1863, he was appointed as a brigadier general of cavalry and participated in the Knoxville Campaign. His brigade consisted of the 1st, 3rd, 4th (Russell's), 9th, and 51st Alabama Cavalry regiments.

His men were routed and dispersed by Federal cavalry on January 27, 1864. He was reassigned to a new command and fought in the Atlanta Campaign. Subsequently, his men harassed William T. Sherman's troops during the March to the Sea. Soon after, he was stripped of his command due to drunkeness, and he was reassigned to administrative duty in Demopolis, Alabama. At the time of the Confederacy's collapse  and the end of the war, Morgan was trying to organize Alabama black troops for home defense.

Reconstruction era 

After the war ended, Morgan tried briefly to be a farmer, but he failed in the endeavor. He resumed his law practice in Selma, Alabama, and he soon became the affluent legal representative for widely-loathed railroad companies. By 1867, purportedly enraged by the sight of formerly enslaved persons serving as policemen and state legislators, Morgan began to play a highly public role against the Republican Reconstruction. He toured throughout the American South giving race-baiting speeches and urging fellow Southerners to refuse all compromise with Reconstruction. Aligning himself with the Bourbon Democrats and employing their electoral strategy, Morgan wrote numerous newspaper editorials urging white Alabama voters to "redeem" their state from Republican control and to unite against African-Americans for "self-preservation."

Amid his political struggle against Reconstruction in 1872, Morgan purportedly succeeded James H. Clanton as the second Grand Dragon of the Ku Klux Klan in Alabama. When President Ulysses S. Grant dispatched his U.S. Attorney General Amos T. Akerman to vigorously prosecute Alabama Klan under the Enforcement Acts, Morgan was arrested and jailed. According to Alabama Representative and segregationist Robert Stell Heflin, Morgan and his friend Edmund W. Pettus did more to preserve white supremacy during the Reconstruction era than any other two men in the state of Alabama or the American South. Heflin explained that "in the dark and trying days of Reconstruction, these two men were foremost among the defenders of Anglo-Saxon civilization. They realized that submission to the reign of the carpetbagger meant the overthrow, the destruction, of all that was sacred to the white man in the South, and knowing this they dared to do things from which the timid would shrink and the coward would flee."

Echoing these sentiments, Alabama Representative Richmond P. Hobson attested that Morgan "took an active part in the work of bringing order out of chaos" during the Reconstruction era and asserted that these efforts resulted in his eventual nomination as U.S. Senator. Likewise, Alabama Representative George W. Taylor asserted that Morgan and Pettus were the ringleaders of white supremacy in Alabama who, more than anyone else in the state, "resisted and finally broke down and destroyed the reconstruction policy which followed the Civil War." Due to his efforts to suppress African-Americans from exercising their political rights and to vouchsafe white supremacy in Alabama during the Reconstruction era, Morgan became a presidential elector on the Democratic ticket in 1876, and he was favored to win Alabama's seat to the United States Senate in that year.

Senatorship  
Following his landslide election in 1876, Morgan was elected six times as U.S. Senator for the state of Alabama in 1882, 1888, 1894, 1900, and 1906, and serving from March 4, 1877, until his death. For much of his tenure, he remained aligned with the Bourbon Democrats, and he served in the Senate alongside his Alabama colleague Edmund W. Pettus, a fellow former Confederate general and Klan member. 

Alongside Democratic U. S. Representative Bourke Cockran of New York, Morgan staunchly labored for the repeal of the Fifteenth Amendment to the U.S. Constitution, which was intended to prevent the denial of voting rights based on race. Morgan also "introduced and championed several bills to legalize the practice of racist vigilante murder [lynching] as a means of preserving white power in the Deep South."

He served as chairman of Committee on Rules (46th U.S. Congress), the Committee on Foreign Relations (53rd U.S. Congress), the Committee on Interoceanic Canals (56th and 57th Congresses), and the Committee on Public Health and National Quarantine (59th U.S. Congress).

Foreign policy 

As a U.S. Senator, Morgan advocated for separating blacks and whites by encouraging the migration of black people to leave the South. Historian Adam Hochschild notes that, "at various times in his long career Morgan also advocated sending them [negroes] to Hawaii, to Cuba, and to the Philippines—which, perhaps because the islands were so far away, he claimed were a 'native home of the negro.'"

By the 1880s, Morgan began to focus on the Congo for his repatriation visions. After the Belgian monarch Léopold II signalled that his International Association of the Congo would consider immigration and settlement of African Americans, Morgan became one of the foremost advocates of this emerging colonial enterprise in Central Africa. Morgan's support was vital for United States' early diplomatic recognition of the new colony, which became the Congo Free State in December 1883.

After revelations about major atrocities by the colonial occupiers, Morgan cut his ties with the Congo Free State. He feared the brutality against the inherent African population would deter black U.S. citizens from emigrating and jeopardize his plans to create an exclusively white American nation. Hence, by 1903, Morgan became the most active U.S. congressional spokesperson of the Congo reform movement, a humanitarian pressure group that demanded reforms in the notorious Congo Free State.

The alliance between this pioneering international human rights movement and the radical white supremacist Morgan has often led to scholarly astonishment. However, the sociologist Felix Lösing pointed to the ideological nexus between the racial segregation promoted by Morgan and calls for cultural segregation raised by prominent Congo reformers. Both Morgan and the majority of the Congo reform movement were ultimately concerned with the consolidation of white supremacy on a global scale.

Between 1887 and 1907, Morgan played a leading role on the powerful Foreign Relations Committee. He called for a canal linking the Atlantic and Pacific oceans through Nicaragua, enlarging the merchant marine and the Navy, and acquiring Hawaii, Puerto Rico, the Philippines, and Cuba. He expected Latin American and Asian markets would become a new export market for Alabama's cotton, coal, iron, and timber. The canal would make trade with the Pacific much more feasible, and an enlarged military would protect that new trade. By 1905, most of his dreams had become reality, although the canal bifurcated Panama instead of Nicaragua.

He was a strong supporter of the annexation of the Republic of Hawaii, and, in 1894, Morgan chaired an investigation known as the Morgan Report into the Hawaiian Revolution. The investigation concluded that the U.S. had remained completely neutral in the matter. He authored the introduction to the Morgan Report based on the findings of the investigative committee. He later visited Hawaii in 1897 in support of annexation. He believed that the history of the U.S. clearly indicated it was unnecessary to hold a plebiscite in Hawaii as a condition for annexation. He was appointed by President William McKinley in July 1898 to the commission created by the Newlands Resolution to establish government in the Territory of Hawaii. A strong advocate for a Central American canal, Morgan was also a staunch supporter of the Cuban revolutionaries in the 1890s.

Death and legacy 

Morgan died in Washington, D.C., while still in office. He was buried in Selma, Alabama, at Live Oak Cemetery, near the grave of fellow Confederate cavalry officer and Klan member Nathan Bedford Forrest. The remainder of Morgan's term was served by John H. Bankhead.

In April 2004, Professor Thomas Adams Upchurch summarized Morgan's career and legacy in the Alabama Review:

Family and relatives 
As the patriarch of a powerful Southern dynasty, Morgan's extended family was especially prominent in Alabama politics and owned the First White House of the Confederacy in Montgomery. His nephew, Anthony Dickinson Sayre, served as a Justice of the Supreme Court of Alabama, and Morgan's grand-niece was Jazz Age socialite Zelda Sayre, the wife of novelist F. Scott Fitzgerald who wrote The Great Gatsby.

Memorialization 
 In 1953, Morgan was elected to membership in the Alabama Hall of Fame.
 John T. Morgan Academy in Selma is named for Morgan. Founded in 1965, the segregation academy originally held classes in Morgan's old house.
 Morgan Hall on the campus of the University of Alabama, which houses the English Department, was named for him.  On December 18, 2015, Morgan's portrait was removed from the building, and in 2016 the university was pondering the results of a petition to rename the building for Harper Lee. By June 2020, the Alabama Board of Trustees had finally decided to study the names of buildings on campus and consider changing them. On September 17, 2020, they voted to remove his name from the building.
 A memorial arch on the grounds of the Federal Building / U.S. Courthouse in Selma honors Senators Morgan and Pettus.

See also 

 List of American Civil War generals (Confederate)
 List of United States Congress members who died in office (1900–49)

References

Notes

Citations

Works cited

Further reading 

 
 
 
 
 morganreport.org — Online images and transcriptions of the Morgan Report
 Alabama Hall of Fame bio

External links 

 

 Men of Mark in America Biography & Portrait
 
 Edmund Pettus and John Tyler Morgan, late senators from Alabama, Memorial addresses (1909)

|-

|-

|-

|-

1824 births
1907 deaths
Alabama Secession Delegates of 1861
American people of Welsh descent
American slave owners
Confederate States Army brigadier generals
Democratic Party United States senators from Alabama
Ku Klux Klan Grand Dragons
People from Athens, Tennessee
People of Alabama in the American Civil War
1860 United States presidential electors
1876 United States presidential electors
Chairmen of the Senate Committee on Foreign Relations
American white supremacists
United States senators who owned slaves
People from Selma, Alabama